Calvin Kenneth Dallas  (born May 10, 1956) is a Canadian politician and former Member of the Legislative Assembly of Alberta representing the constituency of Red Deer-South as a Progressive Conservative.

Early life

Dallas grew up in Central Alberta, spending much of his childhood in Innisfail. After high school, he took farm and ranch management at Olds College.

Dallas then entered the printing and publishing industry where he remained for 25 years, spending nine of those years as publisher of the Red Deer Express. In 2004, he received the Bill Draayer Award from the Alberta Weekly Newspapers Association.

In 2004, Dallas became executive director of the Red Deer Chamber of Commerce.

Political career

Dallas was elected as MLA of Red Deer-South for the second time in the 2012 Alberta general election, with support from 44 per cent of the voters in the constituency. In the 2008 Alberta general election, he won the election with 56 per cent of votes.

From 2011 to 2014 he served as the Minister of International and Intergovernmental Relations in Alberta. Prior to this role, he was appointed Parliamentary Assistant to the Minister of Finance and Enterprise, and Parliamentary Assistant to the Minister of Environment. Prior to this role he was appointed Parliamentary Assistant to the Minister of Environment.

In addition to his regular duties as MLA, he previously served as a member of the Public Accounts Committee, the Standing Committee on the Economy, and the Standing Committee on Private Bills. Dallas has also co-chaired the Climate-Change Central Board and the Overall Factors Task Team with the Alberta Competitiveness Initiative, was vice-chair of the Regulatory Enhancement Project Task force, was a member of the Regulatory Review Secretariat and has served on the Cabinet Policy Committee on Energy.

Personal life

Dallas lives in Red Deer with his wife, Jacqueline. They have two adult children: Scott and Alicia.

Dallas is an active member of his community, where he has sat on the Red Deer College Board of Governors and the Mayor's Task Force on Homelessness. He has also been involved in a variety of organizations, events and recreational supports. Dallas is a former director of the Red Deer Rotary Club and the United Way of Central Alberta. He is also a former vice-president of the Alberta Chamber of Commerce.

In recognition of his involvement, Dallas has received numerous awards, including a 2005 Alberta Centennial Medal, a Queen Elizabeth II Golden Jubilee Medal in 2002 and the Canadian Chamber of Commerce volunteer of the year award in 2002.

Election results

References

Progressive Conservative Association of Alberta MLAs
People from Red Deer, Alberta
Living people
Members of the Executive Council of Alberta
1956 births
21st-century Canadian politicians